Walter S. Jackson (1870 – after 1893) was an English professional footballer who played in the Football League for Small Heath.

Born in the Northfield district of Birmingham, Jackson played local football before joining Small Heath in September 1893. He made his debut in the Second Division on 9 December 1893, deputising at outside right for the injured Jack Hallam in a home game against Burton Swifts which Small Heath won 2–0. Once Hallam regained fitness, Jackson's first-team chances were limited, and he joined Worcester club Berwick Rangers at the end of the 1893–94 season.

References

1870 births
Year of death missing
Footballers from Birmingham, West Midlands
English footballers
Association football wingers
Birmingham City F.C. players
Worcester City F.C. players
English Football League players
Date of birth missing
Place of death missing